"Sometimes I Can't Relate" is an original song about horse and human friendship from the English movie Unbridled starring Oscar nominee Eric Roberts in the lead role. The song is composed by Jibin George Sebastian and sung by Addie Nicole.

Production
This song utilized 10 studios from 5 countries to complete its production. The song is mastered by Sherman de Vries

Reception
The song was featured in various top news outlets including BBC Radio, Malayala Manorama, Huffington Post, Medium , Media One TV, Hit 96.7 , 94.3 Club FM , All India Radioetc.

References
 

English songs
2017 songs
Songs written for films